Rimella fissurella is an extinct species of fossil sea snail, a marine gastropod mollusk in the family Strombidae, the true conchs. This species is found from the Paleocene to the Oligocene of Europe.

References

 Fossils (Smithsonian Handbooks) by David Ward (Page 123)

External links
Rimella fissurella in the Paleobiology Database

Rostellariidae
Paleocene gastropods
Eocene gastropods
Oligocene gastropods
Eocene animals of Europe
Oligocene animals of Europe
Paleocene animals of Europe
Gastropods described in 1767
Taxa named by Carl Linnaeus